Damlacık is a village in the Şahinbey District, Gaziantep Province, Turkey. The village is inhabited by Turkmens of the Qiziq tribe and had a population of  548 in 2022.

References

Villages in Şahinbey District